The Buckhannon River is a  tributary of the Tygart Valley River in north-central West Virginia, USA. It provides drinking water for much of Upshur County.

Geography
The Right Fork flows through the communities of Pickens and Selbyville and collects tributaries known as the Middle Fork Right Fork Buckhannon River and the Left Fork Right Fork Buckhannon River; the Left Fork of the Right Fork flows through the community of Helvetia.

From Alexander the Buckhannon River flows generally northwardly, past Sago, to the city of Buckhannon, then northeastwardly into southwestern Barbour County, past Boulder (Rangoon Post Office) and Carrollton, where it is crossed by the Carrollton Covered Bridge.

According to the West Virginia Department of Environmental Protection, approximately 79.5% of the Buckhannon River's watershed is forested, mostly deciduous; approximately 18.1% is used for agriculture and pasture; and less than 1% is urban.

Name
The city of Buckhannon was officially named for Buckongahelas (1720-1805), the legendary Lenape Chief. A statue of Buckongahelas and his fallen son, crafted by Buckhannon sculptor Ross Straight, was erected in Buckhannon West Virginia’s Jawbone Park in 2000.

Fish life
A low dam, installed for the provision of drinking water, forms a pool stretching upstream of Buckhannon to Sago; downstream of Sago, the Buckhannon is considered to be one of the best streams for muskellunge fishing in West Virginia. In its lowermost course above its mouth, the river assumes a higher gradient and is home to smallmouth bass, rock bass, and sunfish.

Variant names and spellings

According to the Geographic Names Information System & official historic markers, the Buckhannon River has also been known as:
Buckongehanon River
Buckanan River
Buckhanan River
Buckhannans Fork
Buckhanon River

See also
List of West Virginia rivers

References

Rivers of West Virginia
Rivers of Barbour County, West Virginia
Rivers of Randolph County, West Virginia
Rivers of Upshur County, West Virginia
Allegheny Plateau